Freedom Township is a civil township of Washtenaw County in the U.S. state of  Michigan. The population was 1,428 at the 2010 census.

Communities
 Eckert is a historic community within the township and was named for local grocer Frederick Eckert.  The community had a rural post office October 7, 1893 until August 31, 1901.
 Fredonia is a former settlement in the center of the township.  It had a rural post office from July 11, 1838 until July 31, 1901.  
 Freedom is a historic community that is located within township.  James Hill settled in the area in 1831, and a town meeting was first held here when Freedom Township was organized in 1834.  A post office named Freedom operated briefly from May 21, 1867 until March 27, 1869.

Geography

The largest body of water in the township is Pleasant Lake.

Demographics
As of the census of 2000, there were 1,562 people, 561 households, and 417 families residing in the township. There were 612 housing units at an average density of 17.3 per square mile (6.7/km2). The racial makeup of the township was 93.15% White, 0.26% Native American, 0.38% Asian, 5.31% from other races, and 0.90% from two or more races. Hispanic or Latino of any race were 8.77% of the population.

There were 561 households, out of which 31.6% had children under the age of 18 living with them, 67.4% were married couples living together, 3.7% had a female householder with no husband present, and 25.5% were non-families. 20.1% of all households were made up of individuals, and 5.3% had someone living alone who was 65 years of age or older.  The average household size was 2.57 and the average family size was 2.96.

The township's population was spread out, with 26.4% under the age of 18, 5.4% from 18 to 24, 28.4% from 25 to 44, 30.5% from 45 to 64, and 9.3% who were 65 years of age or older.  The median age was 40 years. For every 100 females, there were 107.4 males.  For every 100 females age 18 and over, there were 103.2 males.

The median income for a household in the township was $62,321, and the median income for a family was $73,235. Males had a median income of $45,139 versus $37,188 for females. The per capita income for the township was $26,397.  About 1.2% of families and 5.2% of the population were below the poverty line, including 1.1% of those under age 18 and 3.9% of those age 65 or over.

Education
Freedom Township is served by four public school districts.  The majority of the township is served by Manchester Community Schools to the southwest in Manchester.  The northwest portion of the township is served by Chelsea School District in Chelsea.  A small eastern portion of the township is served by Saline Area Schools in Saline, and a very small portion in the northeast corner is served by Dexter Community School District in Dexter.

Gallery

References

Sources

External links

Freedom Township official website

Townships in Washtenaw County, Michigan
Townships in Michigan
1834 establishments in Michigan Territory
Populated places established in 1834